Tom Rachman (born 1974) is an English-Canadian novelist. His debut novel was The Imperfectionists, published in 2010 by Dial Press, an imprint of Random House. The book has been published in 25 languages.

Rachman was born in London, England, and grew up in Vancouver, Canada. Rachman studied cinema at the University of Toronto and obtained a master's degree from Columbia University Graduate School of Journalism. He worked as a journalist for the Associated Press and the International Herald Tribune. He currently lives in London. His brother is the Financial Times columnist Gideon Rachman and his sister Carla is an art historian; their sister Emily died of breast cancer in 2012.

Works

Fiction
The Imperfectionists (2010), longlisted for the Giller Prize and winner of the Canadian Authors Award for fiction
The Rise & Fall of Great Powers (2014)
Basket of Deplorables (2017), shortlisted for the Edge Hill Prize for best collection of stories
The Italian Teacher (2018), shortlisted for the Costa Award for best novel

Notes

 Christopher Buckley, "The Paper", The New York Times, 30 April 2010.

External links
Tom Rachman

1974 births
Living people
English Jews
Columbia University Graduate School of Journalism alumni
Canadian male novelists
Jewish Canadian writers
University of Toronto alumni
Writers from London
Writers from Vancouver
21st-century Canadian novelists
21st-century English novelists
British Jewish writers
English male novelists
21st-century Canadian male writers